Ogygioses issikii is a species of moth of the  family Palaeosetidae. It is only known from Taiwan.

References

Hepialoidea
Moths described in 1995
Moths of Taiwan
Endemic fauna of Taiwan
Taxa named by Donald R. Davis (entomologist)